

Events
January 23 – Sum Yop Tong leader Fung Jing Toy, known as "Little Pete", is killed by Le-Lum Jung and Chew Tin Gop in San Francisco, California.

Arts and literature

Births
Jack Diamond "Legs", New York Prohibition gangster 
John Lazia, Kansas City gang leader and enforcer for political boss Tom Pendergast 
Paul Ricca (Paolo deLucia) "The Waiter", Chicago Outfit leader 
Joseph Zerilli, Detroit crime family leader and former Eastside Gang and Pascuzzi Combine member
February 6 – Louis Buchalter "Lepke", National Crime Syndicate member
February 20 – Nick Licata, Boss of the Los Angeles crime family
April 7 – Walter Winchell, New York organized crime journalist 
October 2 – Joseph Profaci "Olive Oil King", Profaci crime family founder and Cosa Nostra leader 
November 24, Charles "Lucky" Luciano (Salvatore Lucania), National Crime Syndicate founder and New York Mafia Don
November 27 – Vito Genovese, Genovese crime family founder and Cosa Nostra leader.

Deaths
January 23 – Little Pete (Fung Jing Toy), Sum Yop Tong leader

References 

Years in organized crime
Organized crime